The Cult of the Self (French: Le Culte du moi) is a trilogy of books by French author Maurice Barrès, sometimes called his trilogie du moi. The trilogy was influenced by Romanticism, and it also made an apology of the pleasure of the senses.

Background
Barrès wrote the works while living in Italy. The first book, Under the Eyes of the Barbarians, (Sous l'œil des barbares) was published in 1888. The second work, A Free Man, (Un Homme libre), was published in 1889. The final book, The Garden of Berenice (Le Jardin de Bérénice), was published in 1891.

References

External links
 The Cult of the Self: Sous l'oeil des barbares, Un homme libre, and Le jardin de Bérénice (in French) via Project Gutenberg

1888 French novels
1889 French novels
1891 French novels
Literary trilogies
Novels by Maurice Barrès